Cup Final (gmar gavi'a) is a 1991 Israeli film set during the 1982 invasion of Lebanon by Israel and the 1982 FIFA World Cup.

Plot
A young Israeli soldier, Cohen, is kidnapped by a group of Palestinian fighters who hold him as a hostage during the conflict. The 1982 FIFA World Cup happens to be on during the invasion, and their mutual love of association football, and in particular the Italy national football team, helps break down the barriers of nationalism and the historical baggage that the two bring. A kind of alliance is forged between the two men. Their relationship heads for a tragic ending as the Italian team, along with the goal scoring Paolo Rossi, make their march toward winning the 1982 FIFA World Cup Final.

Reception
Writing in The Washington Post, Hal Hinson called Cup Final "a powerful film, and yet one of the most unassuming great movies ever made". Hanson comments on the relationship between the Cohen and Ziad (the Palestinian commander) as "beautifully mismatched" and that the film's central idea that the men who fight wars would "otherwise be hanging over each other's backyard fence as true friends" was stirringly presented. Stephen Holden, in The New York Times, focuses on the similarity between Ziad and Cohen's loyalties to their team (Italy) and their equally fervent loyalty to soldierly loyalties to Palestine and Israel and that while the film is sometimes "ham-fisted" in its eagerness to make that point, it succeeds in its depictions of warfare, the media, and in the work of the two main actors, Moshe Ivgi. who plays Cohen, the kidnapped Israeli soldier, and Muhamad Bacri, who plays Ziad, the PLO commander.

Festivals
Berlin International Film Festival (20 February 1992)
17th Moscow International Film Festival (1991)

See also
Lebanon (2009 film)
Strangers (2007 Israeli film)
Waltz with Bashir

References

External links 
 

1990s Hebrew-language films
1991 films
1982 FIFA World Cup
Israeli drama films
Italy at the 1982 FIFA World Cup
1990s road movies
Films directed by Eran Riklis
Films about the Israel Defense Forces
Films set in the 1980s
Israeli–Lebanese conflict films
Israeli–Palestinian conflict films